Sophie Shirley (born June 30, 1999) is a Canadian ice hockey player, currently playing with the Wisconsin Badgers women's ice hockey program. She was named to the Canada women's national ice hockey team roster  that shall participate in a pair of games against the United States on December 13 (in Plymouth, Michigan) and December 20, 2016 (in Sarnia, Ontario). Said series against the US shall mark Shirley's debut with the national team.

Playing career
Shirley was a member of Saskatchewan's women's ice hockey team that competed in the 2015 Canada Winter Games. The team would qualify for the bronze medal game, losing to Team Manitoba by a 2–1 mark in overtime.

Competing with the Canada women's national under-18 ice hockey team, she captured a silver medal at the 2016 IIHF World Women's U18 Championship.

Awards and honors
2014 Rookie of the Year Award, Saskatchewan Female Midget AAA League
2014 Second Team All-Star, Saskatchewan Female Midget AAA League
2014 Saskatoon Stars Team MVP
Directorate Award, Best Defender, 2017 IIHF World Women's U18 Championship
2020-21 All-USCHO.com Third Team

References

1999 births
Living people
Ice hockey people from Saskatchewan
Sportspeople from Saskatoon
Canadian women's ice hockey forwards
Wisconsin Badgers women's ice hockey players
Calgary Inferno players